Andrew Gilbert (July 18, 1914 – August 29, 1992) was a Major League Baseball player and coach and a minor league manager. He was a center fielder during the 1942 and 1946 seasons. Listed at 6' 0", 203 lb., Gilbert batted and threw right-handed.

A native of  Bradenville, Pennsylvania, Gilbert entered the majors in 1942 with the Boston Red Sox, playing for them in six games before joining the military service during World War II (1943–45). After discharge, he rejoined the Red Sox in 1946, his last Major League season.

In parts of two seasons, Gilbert was a .083 hitter (1-for-12) with one run and one RBI in eight games. He did not hit a home run. As a defensive replacement, he collected six putouts for a perfect 1.000 fielding percentage.

Following his playing career, Gilbert became a successful minor league manager in 29 seasons with the New York/San Francisco Giants (1950–1980) and Atlanta Braves (1981–1982) organizations. He posted a  2,009–1,889 record for a .514 winning percentage, including league championships with the Springfield Giants (Eastern League, 1959, 1960 [co-champ] and 1961) and  Amarillo Giants (Texas League, 1969 and 1971). He also coached during four seasons for the San Francisco Giants (1972–1975).

Gilbert died in Davis, California at age 78 and is buried in St. Vincent Cemetery in Latrobe, Pennsylvania.

References

 Baseball Reference
 Retrosheet

1914 births
1992 deaths
United States Army Air Forces personnel of World War II
Baseball players from Pennsylvania
Boston Red Sox players
Canton Terriers players
Clarksdale Red Sox players
Danville Leafs players
Louisville Colonels (minor league) players
Major League Baseball center fielders
Minneapolis Millers (baseball) players
Minor league baseball managers
Muskogee Giants players
People from Westmoreland County, Pennsylvania
Rocky Mount Red Sox players
San Francisco Giants coaches
Scranton Red Sox players
Springfield Giants (Ohio) players
Toledo Mud Hens players
American expatriate baseball people in the Dominican Republic